Cermaq is a company which farms salmon and trout in Norway, Canada and Chile. In 2017 the farming business had sales of around USD 1,1 billion, and a total sales volume of 157,800 tonnes. Cermaq is a fully owned subsidiary of Mitsubishi Corporation. The company has its headquarters in Oslo, Norway.

Operations
Cermaq produces Atlantic salmon, coho and trout. In Canada the operations are on Vancouver Island with offices located in Campbell River and Tofino.  In Norway the company has operations in Nordland and Finnmark while the sea operations in Chile are in Region X, XI and XII, headed out of Puerto Montt. The total production of salmon was 157,800 tonnes in 2017.
Cermaq has is  committed to contributing to the UN's Sustainable Development Goals. Cermaq aims to certify all its farming sites to the Aquaculture Stewardship Council salmon standard for responsibly farmed salmon.

History
Cermaq was founded as Statkorn Holding when the commercial division of Statens Kornforretning (now Statens Landbruksforvaltning) was demerged and made a limited company in 1995. The company operated grain wholesaling. In 1996 the company started to purchase NorAqua, a fish food producer, and in 1998 Cermaq started purchasing fish farms. In 2000, the government sold the first 20% of the company. Through the 2000s, Cermaq has sold its original grain wholesaling divisions and entered the seafood and fish food market. It was listed on Oslo Stock Exchange in 2006. Cermaq's feed business unit EWOS was sold in 2013. 
In October 2014, the acquisition of the firm was completed by Mitsubishi Corporation for $1.4 billion.

References

External links

Food and drink companies of Norway
Formerly government-owned companies of Norway
Companies established in 1995
Companies formerly listed on the Oslo Stock Exchange